High Tide at Noon is a 1957 British drama film directed by Philip Leacock. It was entered into the 1957 Cannes Film Festival. High Tide at Noon was based on the first of a series of novels by Elisabeth Ogilvie, set in Maine. Location work was done in Devon.

Plot
A woman named Joanna returns to an island off the coast of Nova Scotia where she was raised, and where memories immediately stir from her past. The entire film is thereafter in flashback.

She recalls being 17 and having the attentions of three young men. She has had a previous kiss with the handsome but arrogant and aggressive Simon Breck and she agrees to meet him. When he makes a move on her she runs off. Nils Sorensen loves her, but is seen by Joanna only as a friend, not a suitor. She ultimately marries Alec Douglas, a gentle soul who reads poetry to her. All the men and all the local fisherman use small boats to fish for Maine lobster.

Economic hardship overwhelms nearly everyone on the island, particularly Joanna's parents, the MacKenzies, as the fishing community's lobster traps start to come up empty. Worse for her, Alec amasses a large debt to Simon as a result of his gambling. It seems that Alec is stealing lobster from rival pots in order to pay his debts. One night, he is drowned: it is unclear if this is accidental but Nils takes part of the blame.

Simon threatens Joanna and Nils drives him off the island, threatening to kill him. Nils offers to marry Joanna but she declines. He leaves the island soon after without saying goodbye. All three men ultimately disappear from her life. However, as the flashback ends, upon her return many years later, Joanna is pleased to once again encounter Nils.

Cast
 Betta St. John as Joanna
 William Sylvester as Alec Douglas
 Michael Craig as Nils Sorenson
 Flora Robson as Donna MacKenzie
 Alexander Knox as Stephen MacKenzie
 Peter Arne as Owen MacKenzie
 Patrick McGoohan as Simon Breck
 Patrick Allen as Charles MacKenzie
 Jill Dixon as Matille Trudeau
 Susan Beaumont as Kristy
 John Hayward as Philip MacKenzie
 Errol MacKinnon as Peter Grant

Production
The original director was Pat Jackson and the original star was to be Virginia McKenna. According to Jackson, McKenna disliked the script, so John Davis of Rank cancelled the film, but he then hired Philip Leacock to direct it and the film was made. Jackson said "poor old Phil, he accepted the assignment, so I gather. 'High Tide at Noon' at that time, so I'm told, cost a lot of money and did not do very well, how could it? A sea picture shot inside! In fact it did disastrously." Rank offered him two more films including Dangerous Exile and turned them down both. Jackson said "that was a total disaster, for me. I mean, that really ended my film career."

References

External links

1957 films
British drama films
1957 drama films
British black-and-white films
Films directed by Philip Leacock
Films set on islands
Films set in Nova Scotia
Films shot in Nova Scotia
Films shot at Pinewood Studios
1950s English-language films
1950s British films